Édouard Louis Nadaud (14 April 1862 – 13 February 1928) was a French classical violinist.

Biography 
Nadaud was born at 46 rue des Dames (Quartier des Batignolles) in the 17th arrondissement of Paris at the home of his father and mother, paper merchants: he was the fourth child of the couple. His two older brothers, Albert and Gustave were salesmen and the marriage certificate of Gustave teaches us that their father was also a music teacher.

He followed violin lessons at the conservatoire de Paris in Charles Dancla's class and obtained a first prize there in 1881 shared with a young American, Arma Senkrah (Harknes) also a student of Charles Dancla and a young Dutchman, Louis Wolff (1865-1926), a student of Lambert Massart.

Concertmaster of the Orchestre de la Société des concerts du Conservatoire for eleven years, he was professor of violin at the conservatory from 1 May 1900 until his death on 13 February 1928. Firmin Touche succeeded him.

He trained about sixty students including René Benedetti, Marius Casadesus, Line Talluel, Lucien Quatrochi, etc.

Prizes and distinctions 
Second violin accessit in 1877 - Piece of competition: Pierre Baillot's 1st Concerto in A minor
First violin accessit in 1878 - Piece of competition: Henri Vieuxtemps's 5th Concerto
Second violin prize in 1880 - Piece of competition: Pierre Rode's 3rd Concerto
First violin prize in 1881 - Piece of competition: Henri Vieuxtemps's third Concerto
 Chevalier of the Légion d'honneur 2 January 1905.

References

Bibliography 
Le Conservatoire National de Musique et de déclamation, documents historiques et administratifs, collected or reconstituted by Constant Pierre, deputy head of the secretariat, laureate of the Institute, PARIS, imprimerie Nationale, 1900

External links 
Portrait à la BNF
 Archives du Ménestrel de 1833 à 1940 on Gallica
 Tableau historique des écoles du violon
 Édouard Nadaud on IMSLP

20th-century French male classical violinists
Conservatoire de Paris alumni
Academic staff of the Conservatoire de Paris
Chevaliers of the Légion d'honneur
1862 births
Musicians from Paris
1928 deaths
Burials at Montmartre Cemetery
19th-century French male classical violinists